Guanlan Renmin Park is a public, urban park in Longhua District, Shenzhen, Guangdong, China. Situated in Guanlan Subdistrict, the park is bordered by Meiguan Expressway on the East, Bilan Road on the West, Buxin Road on the North, and Guanlan Park Road on the South. In 1993 the park was officially opened to the public. The park is used for recreational activities, such as dancing, singing, walking, and gathering.

Tourist attractions

Revolutionary Martyr Monument
The Revolutionary Martyr Monument was established in 1994 by the local government for honoring revolutionary martyrs. It is engraved with the words by Zeng Sheng, a military officer in the People's Liberation Army (PLA): "Eternal life to the revolutionary martyrs".

Lansheng Tower
The Lansheng Tower is octagonal with five stories outside and four blindstories.

Linbo Cloak Bridge
The Linbo Cloak Bridge is a bridge cross the pound in the park.

Xiaoyao Pavilion
The Xiaoyao Pavilion is a Chinese pavilion in the park. Visitors can rest and shelter from its inside.

Gallery

References

Parks in Shenzhen